The 5th Parliament of Zimbabwe met between 2000 and 2005. At the time, the Zimbabwean Parliament was unicameral, consisting of the 150-member House of Assembly, 120 of whom were elected via first-past-the-post voting in single-member constituencies. Of the remaining 30 seats, 12 members were appointed directly by the President, eight were provincial governors who were ex officio members, and ten seats were reserved for chiefs. In the June 2000 parliamentary election, the ruling Zimbabwe African National Union – Patriotic Front (ZANU–PF) won a 62-seat majority of the 120 elected seats, while the newly-formed Movement for Democratic Change (MDC) gained 57 seats, and the Zimbabwe African National Union – Ndonga took one seat.

The members of the 5th Parliament of Zimbabwe were sworn in on 18 July 2000, nearly a month after the election. ZANU–PF's Emmerson Mnangagwa, one of the presidential appointees, was elected Speaker. Edna Madzongwe, also of ZANU–PF, was elected Deputy Speaker. A number of by-elections occurred between 2000 and 2005, raising ZANU–PF's total number of elected seats from 62 to 68.

Composition

Elected members

Unelected members

Membership changes

Notes and references

Notes

References 

members of the 5th Parliament of Zimbabwe